Stu McNeill (born  September 25, 1938) is a Canadian former professional ice hockey player who played eleven games in the National Hockey League with the Detroit Red Wings between 1958 and 1959.

Career statistics

Regular season and playoffs

External links
 

1938 births
Living people
Canadian ice hockey centres
Detroit Red Wings players
Edmonton Flyers (WHL) players
Hamilton Tiger Cubs players
Ice hockey people from Ontario
Regina Pats players
Sportspeople from Thunder Bay